John J. "Bull" Lipski (July 4, 1904 – January 22, 1963) was an American football center who played two seasons with the Philadelphia Eagles of the National Football League. He played college football at Temple University and attended Larksville High School in Larksville, Pennsylvania.

References

External links
Just Sports Stats

1904 births
1963 deaths
Players of American football from Pennsylvania
American football centers
Temple Owls football players
Philadelphia Eagles players